Crossing the Rubicon was an album by the Swedish melodic death metal band Armageddon, released in Europe on the now defunct Wrong Again Records, and in Japan on Toy's Factory records in 1997.  The album features Christopher Amott of Arch Enemy, as well as former Arch Enemy members Peter Wildoer and Martin Bengtsson.  The album was only released in Japan, briefly in Europe, and is extremely hard to find.

Track listing
"2022" (Intro)  – 1:59 (instrumental)
"Godforsaken"  – 4:39 
"The Juggernaut Divine"  – 5:18
"Astral Adventure"  – 4:59 
"Funeral in Space"  – 3:01 (instrumental)
"Asteroid Dominion"  – 4:38 
"Galaxies Away"  – 3:49 (instrumental) 
"Faithless"  – 2:11 
"Children of the New Sun"  – 2:45 (instrumental)
"Into the Sun"  – 4:33

Personnel

Band members
 Jonas Nyrén - vocals
 Christopher Amott - rhythm and lead guitars
 Martin Bengtsson - bass
 Peter Wildoer - drums, percussion

Guest/session musicians
 Michael Amott - vocals
 Fredrik Nordström - keyboards
 Rasmus Fleischer - recorder
 Jakob Törma - violin

Production
Arranged by Armageddon
Produced and Mixed by Fredrik Nordström
Recorded by Anders Fridén and Fredrik Nordström
Mastered by Staffan Olofsson

1997 debut albums
Armageddon (Swedish band) albums
Albums recorded at Studio Fredman
Albums produced by Fredrik Nordström